Marika Labancz (born 23 July 1978) is a Hungarian alpine skier. She competed in the women's slalom at the 1998 Winter Olympics.

References

1978 births
Living people
Hungarian female alpine skiers
Olympic alpine skiers of Hungary
Alpine skiers at the 1998 Winter Olympics
Sportspeople from Nice